The 1929 World Table Tennis Championships women's singles was the third edition of the women's singles championship.

Mária Mednyánszky met Gertrude Wildam in the final of this event winning 21–9, 21–15, 21–12 to secure a third consecutive title.

Draw

Finals

See also
List of World Table Tennis Championships medalists

References

-
-